Howard "Ben" or "Lefty" Bennett Mallonee (March 31, 1894 – February 19, 1978) was an American professional baseball player who played in seven games for the Philadelphia Athletics during the  season.
He was born in Baltimore, Maryland and died there at the age of 83.

He began his professional career in 1916 with the class D Blue Ridge League playing for the Chambersburg Maroons and the Hanover Hornets.  After his time in the major leagues, he returned to the minor leagues, playing for several more years.  His overall batting average in the minor leagues was .322.  His best year was in 1924 with the Richmond Colts of the class B Virginia League, when he had an batting average of .368 in 546 at bats.  He played his last season in the minor leagues with the Spartanburg, Greenville and Asheville of the South Atlantic League in 1929.

External links

Baseball players from Baltimore
Philadelphia Athletics players
Hanover Raiders players
1894 births
1978 deaths